Matylda Matoušková-Šínová (born 29 March 1933 in Brno) is a Czech former gymnast who competed in the 1952 Summer Olympics (bronze, team), in the 1956 Summer Olympics, and in the 1960 Summer Olympics (silver, team).

References

1933 births
Living people
Czech female artistic gymnasts
Olympic gymnasts of Czechoslovakia
Gymnasts at the 1952 Summer Olympics
Gymnasts at the 1956 Summer Olympics
Gymnasts at the 1960 Summer Olympics
Olympic silver medalists for Czechoslovakia
Olympic bronze medalists for Czechoslovakia
Olympic medalists in gymnastics
Sportspeople from Brno
Medalists at the 1960 Summer Olympics
Medalists at the 1952 Summer Olympics